Kids in the Street is the seventh studio album by Justin Townes Earle, released on May 26, 2017 on New West Records. It is the first album Earle recorded outside of his hometown of Nashville; Kids in the Street was recorded with first-time collaborator and producer Mike Mogis at ARC Studios in Omaha, Nebraska. The album is the third and final part of a trilogy, following Earle's Single Mothers(2014) and Absent Fathers(2015). Kids in the Street is Earle's first release on New West Records. The first single from the album was "Champagne Corolla", featuring a lyric video directed by Tom Kirk.

Earle noted the upbeat tone of the album, saying in an interview that he "got married and am getting ready to become a father... this is the first record that I've written since I've been married. There's definitely an uplifting aspect to this record in a lot of ways, because I'm feeling pretty positive... this record's more about looking outward on what's happening, and writing about subjects like gentrification and inner city strife. [Kids in the Street] also has more of a soul influence to it, and it's got a deeper connection to the blues than anything I've done before."

Critical reception

Kids in the Street received fairly positive reviews from music critics. Rolling Stone gave the album three-and-a-half stars out of five, writing that the album "always feels organic, never mannered... Earle [waxes] nostalgic for a childhood in the 1990s with a timelessness that could conjure the 1890s just as well". The Guardian noted a "quiet contentment" in the music, instead of the "bleakness" found on Single Mothers and Absent Fathers. NPR credited Mike Mogis's production for adding "appealingly unexpected textures" to the songs, while Paste Magazine said that Earle "walk[s] the line between tradition and his own modernity". New Noise praised the album's "versatile offering of country, folk, blues, jazz[,] and soulful rock". Blurt wrote that Kids in the Street is "just as charming and powerful as [Single Mothers and Absent Fathers]".

Track listing

Personnel

Main band
Justin Townes Earle – vocals, guitar
Scott Seiver – drums, percussion, claps
Paul Niehaus – electric guitar, baritone guitar, pedal steel
Max Stehr – upright bass
Ben Brodin – piano, electric piano, Hammond B-3 organ, pump organ, clavinet, vibraphone

Additional musicians
Mike Mogis – baritone electric guitar, acoustic guitar, mandolin, 12-string acoustic guitar, hi-strung guitar, percussion, bajo sexto, banjo, bass, claps
Dave Ozinga – drums, percussion
Andrew Janak – saxophone, clarinet
Miwi La Lupa – trumpet, vocals
Megan Siebe – cello
Corina Figueroa Escamilla – vocals

Production
Production, recording – Mike Mogis
Assistant engineers – Adam Roberts and Jon Ochsner
Mastering – Gavin Lurssen
Package design: – Donny Phillips
Photography – Joshua Black Wilkins

References

2017 albums
Justin Townes Earle albums
New West Records albums
Albums produced by Mike Mogis